The Design 1038 ship (full name Emergency Fleet Corporation Design 1038) was a steel-hulled tanker ship design approved for production by the United States Shipping Boards Emergency Fleet Corporation (EFT) in World War I. A total of 16 ships were ordered of which 8 were cancelled and 8 completed from 1919 to 1920. The ships were constructed at the Mobile, Alabama shipyard of the Mobile Shipbuilding Company.

References

Bibliography

External links
 EFC Design 1038: Illustrations

Standard ship types of the United States
Design 1038 ships